Walton-on-the-Naze railway station is one of the two eastern termini of the Sunshine Coast Line, a branch of the Great Eastern Main Line, in the East of England. It serves the seaside town of Walton-on-the-Naze, Essex. It is  down the line from London Liverpool Street. Its three-letter station code is WON.

The station was opened by the Tendring Hundred Railway, a subsidiary of the Great Eastern Railway, in 1867. It is currently managed by Greater Anglia, which also operates all trains serving the station.

History
The station was opened as Walton-on-Naze on 17 May 1867 by the Tendring Hundred Railway, then worked by the Great Eastern Railway (GER). The GER acquired the Tendring Hundred Railway and the adjacent Clacton-on-Sea Railway on 1 July 1883.  The Wivenhoe & Brightlingsea line was also absorbed by the GER on 9 June 1893. The line later became part of the London and North Eastern Railway (LNER) in 1923 and then part of the Eastern Region of British Railways, following nationalisation in 1948.

There was a small locomotive shed at the station and, on 1 January 1922, this had an allocation of two GER Class Y65 2-4-2T engines. The shed was later converted into a coach-park.

In 1929, the LNER introduced luxurious Pullman day excursion trips from Liverpool Street to various seaside resorts. The service ended in September 1939, due to the outbreak of World War II.

The station was renamed Walton-on-the-Naze in May 2007 to reflect properly the name of the town that it serves.

Accidents and incidents
On 12 August 1987 a passenger train over-ran the buffer stops at Walton-on-Naze and became embedded in the station building. Six people and the train's driver were injured in the incident. The driver was also deemed to have been at fault for not applying the emergency brake in addition to the normal brakes.

Services

The typical current service pattern is:

Passengers for  must change at Thorpe-le-Soken for a connecting service.

There are some additional services to and from London Liverpool Street during peak hours.

References

External links 

 Walton-on-the-Naze station in 1960

Railway stations in Essex
DfT Category E stations
Former Great Eastern Railway stations
Greater Anglia franchise railway stations
Railway stations in Great Britain opened in 1867
Railway station